Fort McMurray Roman Catholic Separate School Division No. 32 or the Fort McMurray Catholic School Division (FMCSD) is the Catholic school board in Fort McMurray, Alberta, Canada.

Schools
There are a total of thirteen schools operating under the Fort McMurray Catholic School Division, featuring a Science and Technology Centre located at Father Patrick Mercredi Community High School, and a Performing Arts Theatre located at Holy Trinity Catholic High School.
 Elementary schools (K-6)
 St. Martha School
 Father J.A. Turcotte School
 Good Shepherd School
 Father Beauregard School
 Ecole St. Paul School
 St. Gabriel School
 Sister Mary Phillips School
 St. Anne School
 St. Kateri School
 Elsie Yanik Catholic School
 Secondary schools (7-12) 
 Father Patrick Mercredi Catholic High School
 Holy Trinity Catholic High School
 FMCSD Outreach

See also
List of Alberta school boards
Fort McMurray Public School District

References

External links
Fort McMurray Catholic School Division

School districts in Alberta
Fort McMurray